Crevedia may refer to several entities in Romania:

 Crevedia, a commune in Dâmboviţa County
 Crevedia Mare, a commune located in Giurgiu County
 Crevedia Mică, a commune located in Giurgiu County
 Crevedia, a tributary of the Chiricanu in southern Romania
 Crevedia (Colentina), a tributary of the Colentina in Dâmbovița County
 Crevedia (Jiu), a tributary of the Jiul de Vest in Hunedoara County
 N. Crevedia, a poet